This is a list of various lists of Hindus related topics grouped under related sections.

Deities, sants, gurus, and entities 

 List of Hindu deities
 List of titles and names of Krishna
 List of Tridevis
 List of names of Vishnu
 List of avatar claimants
 List of mythological objects (Hindu mythology)
 List of Gandharvas
 List of Nāgas
 List of Rakshasas
 List of Asuras
 List of Hindu gurus and sants
 List of teachers of Vedanta

Empires and kingdoms 

 List of Hindu empires and dynasties
 List of Ikshvaku dynasty kings in Hinduism

Scholars and teachers 

 List of teachers of Vedanta
 List of teachers of Advaita Vedanta
 List of Hindu comparative religionists
 List of writers on Hinduism

Practitioners of Hinduism

Hindus by nationality, regions or sect 

 List of Bangladeshi Hindus
 List of Kashmiri Hindus
 List of International Society for Krishna Consciousness members and patrons

Converts to and from Hinduism 

 List of converts to Hinduism
 List of converts to Hinduism from Christianity
 List of converts to Hinduism from Islam
 List of converts to Hinduism from Buddhism

 List of former Hindus
 List of converts to Buddhism from Hinduism
 List of converts to Christianity from Hinduism
 List of converts to Islam from Hinduism
 List of converts to Sikhism from Hinduism

Scriptures and texts 

 List of Hindu scriptures
 List of sutras
 List of suktas and stutis

 Timeline of Hindu texts
 Other related
 List of historic Indian texts
 Sanskrit literature

Temples, holy sites and worship

 Hindu pilgrimage sites
 Hindu pilgrimage sites in India

 Lists of Hindu temples by country
 List of Hindu temples outside India
 List of largest Hindu temples
 List of large Hindu temples
 List of large temple tanks
 List of tallest Gopurams
 List of human stampedes in Hindu temples
 List of tallest Hindu statues
 Ghats in Varanasi
 Tirthas of Rameswaram

Organisations 

 List of Hindu organisations
 List of Hindu nationalist political parties

Festivals 

 List of Hindu festivals
 List of Hindu festivals in Punjab

Sanskrit and education 

 List of Sanskrit universities in India
 List of Sanskrit academic institutes outside India
 List of yoga schools

Other uses 

 List of materials used in Hinduism

See also 

 Indian-origin religions

 
Hinduism-related lists